Çamlıdere is a town and district of Ankara Province in the Central Anatolia region of Turkey, 108 km north-west of the city of Ankara. According to 2010 census, population of the district is 7297 of which 2994 live in the town of Çamlıdere.

Çamlıdere was settled by the Seljuk Turks and there are a number of Seljuk period buildings in the area.

Many fossils and petrified forest have been found in the area.

Demographics 
The population of Çamlıdere is experiencing a rapid depopulation, especially in rural villages, like many other rural and remote areas in Central Anatolia. The population living in villages decreased from 16,464 to a record-low of 3,915 in the period 1965–2012. The urban population declined slightly from 3,132 to 2,764 in the same period.

Villages

Çamlıdere today
This is an attractive woodland district with lakes, meadows, a deer park, a scout camp and many other places for camping, walking and picnics. In summertime Çamlıdere is busy with day-trippers from Ankara and there is a growing number of guest-houses for weekenders coming to enjoy the fresh air and open skies. The people in this rural area are typically conservative and religious in outlook.

The summer festival in July features oil-wrestling, music, dance, circumcisions of boys, and pilgrimage to the tomb of Sheikh Ali Semerkandi.

Places of interest
 The country house of former president İsmet İnönü.

Notes

References

External links
 District governor's official website 

 
Populated places in Ankara Province
Districts of Ankara Province